Aritz Borda Etxezarreta (born 3 January 1985) is a Spanish professional footballer who plays as a central defender.

Club career
Born in Lasarte-Oria, Gipuzkoa, Borda spent his first seven seasons as a senior in the Segunda División B, competing exclusively in his native Basque Country with the exception of CD Mirandés, which he represented in 2010–11, starting in all the league matches he appeared in for the Castile and León side as they fell short in the promotion playoffs.

Borda joined Recreativo de Huelva of Segunda División for 2011–12 campaign. He made his official debut with the Andalusians on 7 September 2011, in a 0–2 home loss against Elche CF in the second round of the Copa del Rey. His league debut arrived on 22 October, as he again played the full 90 minutes in a 2–1 defeat at AD Alcorcón. He scored his first goal as a professional on 13 November, helping to a 4–2 home win over UD Las Palmas.

On 14 June 2012, aged 27, Borda moved abroad for the first time and signed a two-year contract with Cypriot club APOEL FC. He scored his first goal for his new team on 11 November, the game's only at Ethnikos Achna FC, and won the First Division in his first season for the first major accolade of his career.

During 2013–14, Borda made five appearances in the group stage of the UEFA Europa League, and helped to a treble conquest of league, Cup and Super Cup. After leaving in June 2014, he went on to play with Thai Premier League's Muangthong United F.C. for a few months.

Borda switched clubs and countries again on 4 February 2015, joining FC Rapid București from the Romanian Liga I. On 13 July he returned to his native country, after agreeing to a one-year deal with Deportivo Alavés.

On 5 July 2016, Borda signed a two-year contract with Australian club Western Sydney Wanderers FC. On 29 July 2017 he left by mutual consent, after an extremely poor start to the season which saw him give away penalties and be sent off twice, being subsequently dropped from the squad.

Style of play
Borda was described as a central defender with a very good aerial game. He was strong in the challenge and was a good passer of the ball with both feet; additionally, he was proficient in build up play and had the ability to score goals from set pieces in attack.

Club statistics

Honours
APOEL
Cypriot First Division: 2012–13, 2013–14
Cypriot Cup: 2013–14
Cypriot Super Cup: 2013

Alavés
Segunda División: 2015–16

References

Notes

External links

1985 births
Living people
People from Lasarte-Oria
Spanish footballers
Footballers from the Basque Country (autonomous community)
Association football defenders
Segunda División players
Segunda División B players
Real Sociedad B footballers
Real Unión footballers
Bilbao Athletic footballers
CD Mirandés footballers
Recreativo de Huelva players
Deportivo Alavés players
Burgos CF footballers
Cypriot First Division players
APOEL FC players
Aritz Borda
Aritz Borda
Liga I players
FC Rapid București players
A-League Men players
Western Sydney Wanderers FC players
Spanish expatriate footballers
Expatriate footballers in Cyprus
Expatriate footballers in Thailand
Expatriate footballers in Romania
Expatriate soccer players in Australia
Spanish expatriate sportspeople in Cyprus
Spanish expatriate sportspeople in Thailand
Spanish expatriate sportspeople in Romania
Spanish expatriate sportspeople in Australia